Colonel Conwyn Mansel-Jones  (14 June 1871 – 29 May 1942) was an English British Army officer. He was a recipient of the Victoria Cross, the highest and most prestigious award for gallantry in the face of the enemy that can be awarded to British and Commonwealth forces.

Early career
Educated at Haileybury and the Royal Military College Sandhurst, Mansel-Jones was commissioned a second lieutenant in The West Yorkshire Regiment (The Prince of Wales's Own) on 8 October 1890.  He was promoted to lieutenant on 1 July 1892, served with his regiment in the Fourth Anglo-Ashanti War of 1895-96 and in British Central Africa in 1898, where he was promoted to captain supernumerary to his regiment on 20 March 1899. He was recalled to his regiment at the outset of the Second Boer War in late 1899, and sent to South Africa.

Victoria Cross
Mansel-Jones took part in the Ladysmith relief force, and was confirmed as a captain in his regiment in February 1900. He was wounded on 27 February 1900, during the battle of the Tugela Heights, two days before the actual relief of Ladysmith.

Mansel-Jones was 28 years old, and a captain in The West Yorkshire Regiment (The Prince of Wales's Own) serving in during the Second Boer War when the following deed took place in Natal for which he was awarded the VC:

Later career
He remained in the army in recruiting until he retired due to his wounds in 1910. He was called to the bar at Lincoln's Inn but returned to the colours in 1914. He served throughout the European War and was six times mentioned in Despatches.

References

 Location of grave and VC medal (Hampshire)
 Anglo-Boer War profile

Second Boer War recipients of the Victoria Cross
British recipients of the Victoria Cross
Companions of the Distinguished Service Order
Companions of the Order of St Michael and St George
West Yorkshire Regiment officers
1871 births
1942 deaths
People educated at Haileybury and Imperial Service College
Graduates of the Royal Military College, Sandhurst
British military personnel of the Fourth Anglo-Ashanti War
Members of Lincoln's Inn
British Army personnel of World War I
British Army personnel of the Second Boer War
Officiers of the Légion d'honneur
People from Wallington, London
Honourable Corps of Gentlemen at Arms
British Army recipients of the Victoria Cross